Reang Democratic Party was a political party in Mizoram, India, working for a Reang Autonomous District Council in southern Mizoram.

The party was founded in 1990. Swaibunga Reang was the president of RDP. RDP merged with the Bharatiya Janata Party on October 4, 1993.

At present moment, it is now defunct and no longer exist as a political party but is still working on some minor issues.

References

Political parties in Mizoram
1990 establishments in Mizoram
Political parties established in 1990
1993 disestablishments in India
Political parties disestablished in 1993